Æthelwulf (died 858) was King of Wessex from 839 until his death.

Æthelwulf may also refer to:
 Æthelwulf, or Adulf (died ), Anglo-Saxon cleric and saint
 Æthelwulf of Elmham (died after 781), Anglo-Saxon Bishop of Elmham
 Æthelwulf of Selsey (died ), Anglo-Saxon Bishop of Selsey
 Æthelwulf of Berkshire (died 871), Saxon ealdorman who won the Battle of Reading
 Æthelwulf, or Athulf (died after 1013), Anglo-Saxon Bishop of Hereford
 Æthelwulf (poet), Anglo-Saxon poet, author of De abbatibus

See also
 Adelolf, Count of Boulogne (died 933), Flemish-Saxon nobleman